Rogozhskoe cemetery in Moscow, Russia, is the spiritual and administrative center of the largest Old Believers denomination, called the Russian Orthodox Old-Rite Church. Historically, the name cemetery was applied to the whole Old Believer community, with living quarters, cathedral, almshouses, libraries, archives and the Old-Rite Institute (established in 1907). Actual 12 hectare cemetery is now a non-denominational municipal burial site; the Old Believers operate a closed spiritual community in the southern part of the historical Rogozhsky township, while Russian Orthodox church operates church of Saint Nicholas, located between the cemetery and Old Believer territory.

History 

In 1762, the first year of her reign, Catherine II of Russia opened Russia to settlers of all confessions, excluding Jews, in particular inviting the Old Believer fugitives, whose spiritual center at that time was based in present-day Belarus. A group of fugitives who returned to Moscow became the nucleus of future Rogozhskoe community.

Moscow Old Believers operated two cemeteries within the city borders – on near Serpukhov Gates, another on the Tverskaya road. After a devastating plague of 1770–1772 all burials within the city limits were banned; instead, the Crown established new cemeteries well beyond the city border. The new cemetery of Old Believers laid one mile east from city border, between the roads to Vladimir and Ryazan, south from the village Novaya Andronovka. Mass graves from the 1771 plague were preserved at Rogozhskoe till the 20th century.

In the last quarter of the 18th century, the cemetery became a spiritual center of popovtsi Old Believers – a denomination that relied on professional, ordained clergy rather than informal spiritual leaders. By the beginning of the 19th century, popovtsi had built three churches (or chapels). The oldest, dedicated to Saint Nicholas, was laid down in 1776 (on the site of present-day Saint Nicholas church of the Orthodox denomination). By the end of Alexander I reign, the sloboda around the cemetery grew up into a small town with five convents; informal leadership of the Cemetery was vested to Mother Pulcheria (born Pelagea Shevlyukova), and later father Ivan Yastrebov, who gained influence during the September 1812 for saving treasures of Rogozhskoe from the French troops.

The influence of Rogozhskoe clergy grew due to scarcity of Old-Rite clergy in the Russian hinterland; even the basic Old-Rite services, like weddings and confessions, were only available here. As a result, out-of-town pilgrimage quickly multiplied the wealth in Rogozhskoe coffers.

Although Old Believers were allowed to build new churches, none of them was a true church from the government standpoint. Rather, they were classified as chapels and thus could not provide the full range of services expected from a church, including Holy Liturgy – at least, legally. In 1823 Rogozhskoe was hit by the government for the first time: police searched the community, confiscated the altarpiece donated by Matvey Platov and shut down all churches. They reopened soon on condition that Old Believers will no longer serve Holy Liturgy.

Nicholas I of Russia increased the pressure, banning ordination of new Old-Rite priests and relocation of existing Old-Rite priests from town to town. As a result, by the 1850s Rogozhskoe clergy shrunk through natural attrition to just three priests and the government confiscated the unused St. Nicholas church in favour of more acceptable edinoverie denomination. Old Believers of Rogozhskoe reacted by establishing a new spiritual and educational center beyond the Russian border, in Austro-Hungary, creating the Belokrinitskaya Hierarchy.

Cathedral of Protection 

In 1791 the community obtained a permit to build the cathedral of Protection of Our Lady. Architectural drafts (eventually lost) were signed by someone Kazakov, which could be either Matvey Kazakov or his lesser-known contemporary Rodion Kazakov. The cathedral, as planned, would have exceeded in size the Dormition Cathedral of Moscow Kremlin; it was intended for use in summer only due to high costs of heating in winter. The builders laid down the foundation even larger than Kazakov's design; worse, they changed the design from a single dome to five domes. In summer 1792, when the walls were nearly complete, Orthodox clergy 'uncovered the plot' and alerted Empress Catherine. Catherine, wary of growing influence of the dissidents, ordered demolition of the 'unlawful' additions; Moscow governor, prince Prozorovsky, complied and assigned architect Semyon Karin to supervise demolition.

As a result, the cathedral was built with a single dome resting on an elongated, flat slab with minimalistic neoclassical finishes. Parts of the  building are apparently mismatched, revealing the conflict of the client and the Crown. Traces of baroque influence, like the circular windows of the main dome, give away its 18th-century roots. As-built design is attributed, by exclusion, to Semyon Karin.

Inside, the cathedral has three aisles and eight load-bearing columns, and is decorated in an 'old-looking' style intended to resemble pre-Nikonian cathedrals. The icons actually date back to 15th–16th centuries, while the neoclassical iconostasis clearly belongs to the 19th century.

Church of Nativity of Christ 

Church of Nativity, commissioned in 1804, was intended to complement the summer cathedral in winter. It was designed, most likely, by Ivan Zhukov. In line with the fashion of the early 19th century, the design mixes neoclassical layout with Gothic revival details, most visible on the northern and southern facades (the western facade, open to outside world, carries only a neoclassical portico). Just like the cathedral, Nativity church is a three-aisle slab with a single dome, however, its transepts are more pronounced. The church was insignificantly expanded in 1908–1909, with secondary altars installed in transept niches and more Gothic features added.

In the Soviet period the dome was torn down and is being recreated since 2007.

Church of Saint Nicholas 

The first chapel of the community, St. Nicholas was separated from it in 1854, when the government pressed popovtsi out and granted the church building to edinoverie – a least independent Old Believer denomination in communion with state Orthodox church. Existing St. Nicholas, financed by personal funds of M. P. Alabin, was designed by Vasily Karneev and built in two stages, 1863–1867 and 1879. This church is of a single-aisle type (without internal columns), ornately imitating Moscow baroque of the late 17th century. Present-day St. Nicholas belongs to mainline Russian Orthodox church, since edinoverie practically disintegrated in the 20th century.

Bell tower 

The tallest and most visible building of the Cemetery, a free-standing bell tower was built in 1908–1909, soon after the government lifted prior ban on Old Believer church construction. Rogozhskoe tower is exactly one meter lower than Moscow's tallest religious building – Ivan the Great Bell Tower. It was designed by Fyodor Gornostaev (artistic design) and Zinovy Ivanov (structural engineering and construction management). Minor work on internal and external finishes continued until 1913. The first floor housed a small Church of Resurrection, the upper floors – library and a sacristy. The bells, all internal finishes and parts of external ornaments were lost in the Soviet period and are being recreated.

Old-Rite Institute 

The Old-Rite Teachers Institute, like the bell tower, emerged in 1912 after lifting the bans on Old Believers. Initially it operated in Nikoloyamskaya Street, managed by Alexander Rybakov (father of Boris Rybakov). In 1914–1915 the community erected a new Institute (two blocks east from the cathedral); it was closed after the revolution of 1917 and eventually converted to a municipal school.

The Cemetery also retains a number of old two-story buildings; some are operating, some dilapidated and expecting a complete rebuild (like the Cemetery Hotel, adjacent to St. Nicholas).

Notable graves 

Historical graves of Rogozhskoe cemetery significantly differ from contemporary Moscow cemeteries due to their Old Believer roots. Most graves are shaped as plain stone crosses; there are no empire style column-shaped graves or personified sculptures. The largest and richest family burial belongs to the Morozov dynasty – a 'cemetery within a cemetery' protected by an elaborate wrought iron canopy. The dynasty apparently continues – the last Morozov tomb is dated 2005. Other wealthy businesspeople and Old-Rite clergy were buried in black sarcophagus-styled graves. Only a few tombs, like the 1907 Nikolaev tomb, bear distinct sculptural artwork – of abstract floral design.

In the Soviet period, due to proximity to military facilities in Lefortovo, Rogozhskoe cemetery hosted graves of military personnel (currently, 7 graves of Heroes of Soviet Union are listed memorials).

See also
 Preobrazhenskoe Cemetery
 Fyodor Gornostaev, architect of Rogozhskoye Bell Tower
 Agrefeny (fl. 1370), Russian monk whose account of his travels was preserved in a manuscript at Rogozhskoye

References

External links
 History of the cemetery (in Russian)
 

Christianity in Moscow
Old Believer communities in Russia
Eastern Orthodox cemeteries
Cemeteries in Moscow